Madtsoia is an extinct genus of madtsoiid snakes. It is known from the Eocene of Argentina (M. bai), the Paleocene of Brazil (M. camposi), the Late Cretaceous (Maastrichtian) of India (M. pisdurensis), and the Late Cretaceous (Maastrichtian) of Madagascar (M. madagascariensis).

Distribution 
Fossils of Madtsoia have been found in:

Coniacian
 In Beceten Formation, Niger

Campanian
 Laño, Spain 

Late Cretaceous (Maastrichtian)
 Lameta Formation, India
 Maevarano Formation, Madagascar

Eocene
 Casamayoran Sarmiento Formation, Argentina
 Itaboraian Las Flores Formation, Argentina and Itaboraí Formation, Brazil

References

Further reading 
 Snakes: The Evolution of Mystery in Nature by Harry W. Greene
 In the Shadow of the Dinosaurs: Early Mesozoic Tetrapods by Nicholas C. Fraser and Hans-Dieter Sues

External links 
 Madtsoia in The Paleobiology Database

Cretaceous snakes
Paleocene lepidosaurs
Eocene snakes
Oligocene lepidosaurs
Coniacian genus first appearances
Eocene genus extinctions
Cretaceous–Paleogene boundary
Late Cretaceous reptiles of Africa
Cretaceous Madagascar
Fossils of Madagascar
Maevarano fauna
Cretaceous Niger
Fossils of Niger
Late Cretaceous reptiles of Europe
Paleocene reptiles of South America
Eocene reptiles of South America
Oligocene reptiles of South America
Deseadan
Tinguirirican
Divisaderan
Mustersan
Casamayoran
Itaboraian
Paleogene Argentina
Fossils of Argentina
Fossil taxa described in 1933
Taxa named by George Gaylord Simpson
Golfo San Jorge Basin
Sarmiento Formation